Li Jiayang  (born 1956) is a Chinese agronomist and geneticist. He is Vice Minister of Agriculture in China and President of the Chinese Academy of Agricultural Sciences (CAAS). He is also Professor and Principal investigator at the Institute of Genetics and Development at the Chinese Academy of Sciences (CAS).

Education
Li was educated at Anhui Agricultural University in China where he was award a Bachelor's degree in Agronomy in 1982. He continued his education in the United States where he was awarded a PhD in 1991 from Brandeis University for his research into the enzymes involved in the reduction of sulfate (ATP sulfurylase and adenosine 5'-phosphosulfate sulfotransferase) in the single-celled organism Euglena.

Career
Following his PhD, Li completed postdoctoral research with Robert L. Last at Cornell University. He has been Professor of plant molecular genetics at the Institute of Genetics, Chinese Academy of Sciences since 1994.

Awards and honours
Li was elected a Foreign Member of the Royal Society (ForMemRS) in 2015. His nomination reads:

Li was also elected a Member of the Chinese Academy of Sciences (CAS) in 2001, a Fellow of the Third World Academy of Sciences (TWAS) in 2004, a Foreign Associate of the National Academy of Sciences (NAS) of the USA in 2011, a Member of the German Academy of Sciences Leopoldina in 2012, and a Foreign Member of the European Molecular Biology Organization (EMBO) in 2013.

References

1956 births
Living people
Alternate members of the 18th Central Committee of the Chinese Communist Party
Anhui Agricultural University alumni
Biologists from Anhui
Brandeis University alumni
Chinese agronomists
Chinese geneticists
Chinese Communist Party politicians from Anhui
Foreign associates of the National Academy of Sciences
Foreign Members of the Royal Society
Members of the Chinese Academy of Sciences
Members of the Standing Committee of the 13th National People's Congress
People's Republic of China politicians from Anhui
Politicians from Hefei
TWAS fellows